Shixia is a town of Xihe County, Gansu, China. , it has 14 villages under its administration. It is one of the poorest villages in Xihe, most of its 11,085 population relying on farming.

References

Township-level divisions of Gansu
Xihe County